Lithuania men's national canoe polo team is a national team representing Lithuania.

Tournament records

World championships 
1994-2012 – Did not compete

European championships 
1997  - 10th
1999  - 13th
2001  - 12th
2013  - 17th
2015  - 17th

Roosters 
1997: Regimantas Vaičiulis, Kęstutis Dambrauskas, Arūnas Tuminauskas, Gintautas Tacionis, Mindaugas Ražinskas, Gintaras Rasymas
1999: Regimantas Vaičiulis, Kęstutis Dambrauskas, Arūnas Tuminauskas, Gintautas Tacionis, Mindaugas Ražinskas, Gintaras Rasymas, Audrius Bernatavičius, Audrius Packevičius, Egidijus Jakavonis
2001: Regimantas Vaičiulis, Kęstutis Dambrauskas, Aurimas Kančys, Gintautas Tacionis, Arūnas Kunčinas, Gintaras Rasymas, Rimvydas Insoda
2013: Sigitas Ladyš, Lukas Kudaba, Robertas Paškovskis, Tomas Mikna, Augustas Platūkis, Vilius Rasimavičius, Povilas Atmanavičius.

References 

C
Canoe polo